The Rad Plzen cis. 9 ZCBJ (SD10-6) is a building located in Morse Bluff, Nebraska that was built in 1911. It was listed on the National Register of Historic Places on March 20, 1986.  The building historically served as a meeting hall for the Czech community.  It was the meeting hall for the ZCBJ Lodge Plzen, a branch of the Zapadni Ceska Bratrska Jednota.  The ZCBJ Lodge Plzen was originally organized on June 6, 1880 as a branch of the Czech-Slovak Protective Society, but was incorporated into ZCBJ in 1897.

The ZCBJ evolved into the Western Fraternal Life Association (WFLA).  As membership in the Morse Bluff area declined, the organization found it increasingly difficult to maintain the hall.  In 2001, the building was transferred to Morse Bluff American Legion Post 340; the WFLA retained the right to use the hall, as long as it continued to operate in the area.  Beside Legion and WFLA activities, the hall is rented out for events such as wedding receptions, reunions, and graduation parties.

References

External links
 

Western Fraternal Life Association
Czech-American culture in Nebraska
Czech-Slovak Protective Society
Buildings and structures in Saunders County, Nebraska
Clubhouses on the National Register of Historic Places in Nebraska
Renaissance Revival architecture in Nebraska
Buildings and structures completed in 1911
National Register of Historic Places in Saunders County, Nebraska